The fourth season of America's Best Dance Crew premiered on August 9, 2009. All three regular judges, host Mario Lopez, and backstage correspondent Layla Kayleigh returned. This was the last season to feature Shane Sparks as a judge. In the live finale, which aired on September 27, 2009, We Are Heroes was declared the winner.

On August 2, 2009, as a prologue for the season, the show premiered a special episode hosted by Randy Jackson called "The Top 10 Performances of All Time", where Randy showed his favorite routines from the first three seasons.

Cast
Nine dance crews were selected to compete on America's Best Dance Crew. The contestants auditioned in four cities: New York City, Chicago, Orlando, and Los Angeles. Similar to the previous season, the crews were not officially divided by region; however, the regions were still listed on each crew's banner. This was also the first season to showcase crews from three regions, instead of the usual four. The group Vogue Evolution featured the "Wonder Woman of Vogue," Leiomy Maldonado.

Results

Key
 (WINNER) The dance crew won the competition and was crowned "America's Best Dance Crew".
 (RUNNER-UP) The dance crew was the runner-up in the competition.
 (IN) The dance crew was safe from elimination.
 (RISK) The dance crew was at risk for elimination.
 (OUT) The dance crew was eliminated from the competition.

Episodes

Episode 1: Crew's Choice Challenge
Original Airdate: August 9, 2009
The nine new crews chose songs that best showcased their talent in the season premiere. After the bottom three was chosen by the judges, the crews had to face each other in a dance battle to "Boom Boom Pow" by The Black Eyed Peas.

Safe: We Are Heroes, AfroBoriké, Massive Monkees, Artistry in Motion, Rhythm City, Vogue Evolution
Bottom 3: Beat Ya Feet Kings, Southern Movement, Fr3sh
Eliminated: Fr3sh

Episode 2: Beyoncé Challenge
Original Airdate: August 16, 2009
Beyoncé stopped by to hand out the challenges for the crews, who had to use her music videos and tour performances as inspiration for their routines.

Safe: We Are Heroes, Rhythm City, Massive Monkees, Beat Ya Feet Kings, Southern Movement, Vogue Evolution
Bottom 2: Artistry in Motion, AfroBoriké
Eliminated: Artistry in Motion

Episode 3: Martial Arts Challenge
Original Airdate: August 23, 2009
The crews had to incorporate martial arts moves into their routines. Quest Crew's Steve Terada appeared as a guest instructor.

Safe: AfroBoriké, We Are Heroes, Vogue Evolution, Massive Monkees, Beat Ya Feet Kings
Bottom 2: Rhythm City, Southern Movement
Eliminated: Southern Movement

Episode 4: Bollywood Challenge
Original Airdate: August 30, 2009
The six remaining crews were challenged to infuse the flavor of Bollywood culture into their routines. In order to learn the complex Indian-themed dance style, the crews met with Bollywood choreographer Nakul Dev Mahajan.

Safe: Massive Monkees, Vogue Evolution, Rhythm City, AfroBoriké
Bottom 2: We Are Heroes, Beat Ya Feet Kings
Eliminated: Beat Ya Feet Kings

Episode 5: Dance Craze Challenge
Original Airdate: September 6, 2009
The five remaining crews put their own spins on popular dance crazes. In addition to the challenge, the crews also had use the trampoline built into the stage sometime during their routines.

Safe: AfroBoriké, Massive Monkees, Rhythm City
Bottom 2: We Are Heroes, Vogue Evolution
Eliminated: Vogue Evolution

Episode 6: VMA Challenge
Original Airdate: September 13, 2009
The final four crews paid tribute to memorable performances from the MTV Video Music Awards. The crews performed together in an opening number to "Smooth Criminal" by Michael Jackson.

Safe: We Are Heroes, AfroBoriké
Bottom 2: Massive Monkees, Rhythm City
Eliminated: Rhythm City

Episode 7: Decades of Dance Challenge
Original Airdate: September 20, 2009
The crews competed against each other in two challenges: the Decade of Dance Challenge, in which the crews danced to a mix of five songs from the past five decades, and the Last Chance Challenge.

Challenge #1: Decades of Dance Challenge
The remaining three crews had to master dance styles from the last five decades. One crew was eliminated halfway through the show.

Safe: AfroBoriké
Bottom 2: Massive Monkees, We Are Heroes
Eliminated: Massive Monkees

Challenge #2: Last Chance Challenge
The two finalists were given one last chance to perform before the lines opened for the final voting session of the season.

Episode 8: The Live Finale
Original Airdate: September 27, 2009
All nine crews returned for a group performance in the season finale. The judges each picked three crews that complemented each other and their dance styles. Then, the winner was crowned.

Winner: We Are Heroes
Runner-up: AfroBoriké

References

External links
 

2009 American television seasons
America's Best Dance Crew